The following lists events that happened during 2011 in South Africa.

Incumbents
President – Jacob Zuma 
Deputy President – Kgalema Motlanthe
Chief Justice – Sandile Ngcobo then Mogoeng Mogoeng

Cabinet 
The Cabinet, together with the President and the Deputy President, forms part of the Executive.

National Assembly

Provincial Premiers 
 Eastern Cape Province: Noxolo Kiviet 
 Free State Province: Ace Magashule 
 Gauteng Province: Nomvula Mokonyane 
 KwaZulu-Natal Province: Zweli Mkhize 
 Limpopo Province: Cassel Mathale
 Mpumalanga Province: David Mabuza
 North West Province: Thandi Modise 
 Northern Cape Province: Hazel Jenkins 
 Western Cape Province: Helen Zille

Events

February
 9 – A generator fails catastrophically while performing overspeed testing at Duvha Power Station.

May
 18 – Municipal elections take place.

October
 7 – The 14th Dalai Lama is unable to attend the 80th birthday celebration of fellow Nobel Peace Prize laureate Desmond Tutu, having again been refused a visa to enter South Africa.

Deaths

 29 January – Fanus Rautenbach, Afrikaans radio and media personality. (b. 1928)
 18 February – Lucas Maree, South African singer. (b. 1952)
 12 March – Hubert du Plessis, South African composer and pianist. (b. 1922)
 16 March – Carel Boshoff, South African politician, founder of Orania. (b. 1927)
 24 March – Henry Gordon Makgothi, teacher, defiance campaigner and 1956 treason trialist. (b. 1928)
 2 June – Albertina Sisulu, anti–apartheid activist, widow of Walter Sisulu. (b. 1918)
 15 June – Zack du Plessis, Afrikaans actor. (b. 1949)
 22 June – Kader Asmal, politician. (b. 1934)
 11 July – King Maxhob'ayakhawuleza Sandile, Rarabe paramount chief. (b. 1956)
 13 July – Al Debbo, South African actor, comedian and singer. (b. 1924)
 18 July – Magnus Malan, Minister of Defence. (b. 1930)
 11 September – Deon du Plessis, newsman. (b. 1952)
 26 October – Dick Lord, South African Air Force and Fleet Air Arm fighter pilot. (b. 1936)
 22 December – Zithulele Sinqe, long distance athlete. (b, 1963)
 25 December – John Christoffel Kannemeyer, writer, authority on Afrikaans literature. (b. 1939).
 29 December – Amichand Rajbansi, leader of the Minority Front in the South African Parliament. (b. 1942).

Railways

Locomotives
 January – Transnet Rail Engineering at Koedoespoort takes delivery of the first two of ten imported Class  General Electric type C30ACi diesel-electric locomotives for Transnet Freight Rail.
 July – The first of the 133 locally built Class  locomotives rolls out at the Koedoespoort shops in Pretoria.

See also
2011 in South African television

References

Further reading
 

South Africa
2010s in South Africa
Years of the 21st century in South Africa
South Africa